Net Park is a 38-story green and sustainable corporate tower located in Bonifacio Global City, Metro Manila, Philippines. It is part of the office space portfolio of the Net Group, a developer who pioneered the concept of IT office building in the Philippines. The building will be part of the Net Metropolis 5th Ave, a mixed-use development considered as the nation’s first certified green project in Taguig.

The Net Park is the second tower to rise in the Net Metropolis, 5th Avenue. The property was developed by Charlie Rufino of the Rufino family and designed by Chad Oppenheim, a Miami-based architect who specializes in green architecture. It was built with the second Ascott Residences in the Philippines and was expected to reach completion in 2015, but was completed in 2016. Net Park is home to the Google head office in The Philippines.

Features
The Net Park has over 62,000 sqm. of office space with an estimated height of 38 floors. It will have grade A office floor plates with a full retail ground level, podium, and park. Net Park is slated to receive a BERDE certification. BERDE or more formally known as Building for Ecologically Responsive Design Excellence Program  is a green building rating system created by the Philippine Green Building Council to measure, verify, and monitor performance of buildings in the Philippines.

Design
Together with the other buildings in the Net Metropolis, Net Park is designed for sustainability. The skyscraper has passive external shading devices, roof mounted vertical access wind turbines, and a graywater reuse system designed to irrigate all on site landscaping. The towers are orientated to rotate of the other axis to allow natural light into the building and harness maximum sunlight penetration. Interior columns are also minimized to provide floor efficiency and every floor plate is flexible to accommodate differing tenant demands.

Location
The Net Park is built along 5th Ave., one of the main thoroughfares in Fort Bonifacio (Bonifacio Global City). It is on the same street as the Sun Life Centre, another green building certified by LEED and within the same block of major entertainment and dining complexes in BGC: Bonifacio High Street and The Fort Strip.

References

See also
 List of tallest buildings in Metro Manila

Skyscrapers in Bonifacio Global City
Skyscraper office buildings in Metro Manila